Vuotjärvi is a medium-sized lake in Finland. It is located in the Northern Savonia region in Finland, in the municipality of Kuopio. The lake belongs to the Vuoksi main catchment area.

See also
List of lakes in Finland

References

Lakes of Kuopio